Tankebyggarorden (Swedish: Order of the Thought Builders) was a literary fellowship active in Sweden between 1753 and 1763.

Tankebyggarorden was established in Stockholm in 1753 by the Foreign Secretary Carl Friedrich Eckleff, an ardent Freemason, and grew to 34 members, among whom the most famous are the poets Hedvig Charlotta Nordenflycht, Gustaf Philip Creutz and Gustaf Fredrik Gyllenborg.

They published a journal called Our experiments in three parts, 1753-1755. The collection contains outspoken satires (mostly Gyllenborg), directed against considerably old-fashioned, beautiful idyllic poetry (Creutz Sommarqväde and Elegie, etc.), from elevated rhetorical didactics to frivolous little pieces.

The society was formed of a central coterie consisting of Nordenflycht and her inner circle. In 1763 Tankebyggarorden dissolved when Nordenflycht died and Creutz was ordered to Spain . A revival attempt in 1775 failed.

References
 Tankebyggare, Nordisk familjebok (andra upplagan, 1919)

Swedish writers' organizations
1753 in Sweden
1753 establishments in Europe
Learned societies of Sweden
1763 disestablishments in Europe
Fraternal orders